The National Council of Jewish Women (NCJW) is a 501(c)(3) tax exempt organization. Founded in 1893, NCJW is self-described as the oldest Jewish women’s grassroots organization in the United States, currently comprised by over 180,000 members. As of 2021, there are 60 sections in 30 states.  Specifically, NCJW's prioritized interests include expanding abortion access, securing federal judicial appointments, promoting voting integrity, and mobilizing Israeli feminist movements. These objectives are achieved through lobbying,  research, education, and community engagement. NCJW's headquarters are located in Washington, D.C., and the organization maintains offices in numerous other cities in the U.S. as well as in Israel.

Mission statement 
"The National Council of Jewish Women (NCJW) is a grassroots organization of volunteers and advocates who turn progressive ideals into action. Inspired by Jewish values, NCJW strives for social justice by improving the quality of life for women, children, and families and by safeguarding individual rights and freedoms."

History 
In 1893, Hannah G. Solomon of Chicago was asked to organize the participation of Jewish women in the Chicago World's Fair. When Solomon and her recruits discovered that their participation was not solicited for the women to contribute to the proceedings, but would consist of pouring coffee and other hostess duties, they walked out. Rebuffed by the Jewish men at the parliament from playing a substantive role, the assembled women sought to form an organization that would strengthen women's connection to Judaism and builds on that identity to pursue a wide-ranging social justice agenda. That agenda included advocating women's and children's rights, assisting Jewish immigrants, and advancing social welfare, as well as defending Jews and Judaism, advancing Jewish identity and incorporating Jewish values in its work. According to Faith Rogow, author of Gone to Another Meeting: The National Council of Jewish Women (1893–1993), the "NCJW was the offspring of the economic and social success achieved by German Jewish immigrants in the United States. As this community of German Jews matured and stabilized, it faced the same challenge to gender role definitions that had accompanied the Jacksonian Democracy a half-century earlier." (Rogow 1995:2)

At its beginning, NCJW focused on educating Jewish women who had lost a sense of identity with Judaism and on helping Jewish immigrants become self-sustaining in their new land. Activities included promoting education and employment for women through adult study circles, vocational training, school health programs, and free community health dispensaries. NCJW was part of the broader effort of middle and upper-class women to assist those less well off, working closely with the settlement movement epitomized by Jane Addams' Hull House in Chicago. Their work helped create the modern profession of social work. NCJW also began a campaign for social legislation to address low-income housing, child labor, public health, food and drug regulations, and civil rights. In 1908 NCJW argued for a federal anti-lynching law. NCJW also became involved in efforts to promote world peace.

During World War I, NCJW raised funds for war relief in Europe and Russia and helped achieve passage of the Nineteenth Amendment.

Since its founding, the NCJW had fought for abortion access for everyone, and in the 1920s helped found the first ten birth control clinics in the U.S. that later became Planned Parenthood health centers.

As the Depression began, NCJW became involved in government programs to provide relief and help the unemployed find jobs, while continuing its legislative efforts for social legislation. During the 1940s, NCJW called for an end to segregation and racial discrimination. World War II found NCJW engaged in rescuing Jewish children from Germany and working to reunite thousands of displaced persons with family members, as well as a broad range of other relief efforts.

After the war, NCJW fought to preserve civil liberties during the McCarthy era and helped develop the innovative Meals on Wheels program for the elderly and pioneered the Senior Service Corps to help seniors lead productive lives as volunteers. The organization joined the emerging civil rights movement and participated fully in the drive to enact and promote the 1960s' anti-poverty and civil rights programs. NCJW renewed its commitment to women's rights as the revitalized women's movement took shape in the 1960s and 1970s. Focusing its energies on the fate of women and children, NCJW sought childcare programs and family-friendly policies that would benefit children and working mothers and championed reproductive rights. In the 1970s, NCJW officially published a series of documents: Windows on Day Care, the first nationwide survey of day care facilities and services; Children Without Justice, a study of the US Justice Department's work with foster children; and Innocent Victims, a comprehensive manual on child abuse detection and prevention.

The NCJW state, in their principles, that they support the separation of church and state, yet they continue in their support of the present configuration of the State of Israel.

Audio interviews
The University of Pittsburgh houses and has made available a collection of audio interviews produced by the NCJW. Over one hundred audio interviews produced by the Pittsburgh Chapter of NCJW are available online. Those interviewed describe their interactions and affiliations with historical events such as emigration, synagogue events, professional activities, and other topics. These interviews also include information about personal life events, episodes of discrimination against Jews, moving from Europe to America, and meeting Enrico Caruso, Robert Oppenheimer, Jonas Salk and other historical figures. Others who were interviewed came to America but were born elsewhere. Jews from Austria, Brazil, Cuba, Haiti, Hungary, India, Israel, Korea, Poland, and other countries describe their experiences.

NCJW and Israel

NCJW has had a long involvement in promoting the welfare of Israel. Beginning with its Ship-a-Box program to send toys, books, and educational materials to young Holocaust survivors and generations of Israeli children, NCJW began a long collaboration designed to improve the lives of women and children in Israel. NCJW funded the department of education at Hebrew University in Jerusalem for the training of teachers, and eventually established the Research Institute for Innovation in Education (RIFIE) at Hebrew University. The institute assists at-risk children from all segments of Israeli society, including as many as 40 ongoing projects each year in early childhood education, school integration, vocational education, immigrant absorption, and cross-cultural education. Major programs include HIPPY/Haetgar (Home Instruction for Pre-School Youngsters), Manof, and YACHAD. NCJW built Hebrew University High School in Jerusalem. NCJW later launched an Israel Granting Program called Yad B' Yad: NCJW's Initiative to Nurture Knowledge, to support grassroots organizations serving at-risk children and their families in Israel.

NCJW helped launch the NCJW Women Studies Forum at Tel Aviv University, which advances research and analysis in feminist studies while reaching out to the public through empowerment seminars and community services. The NCJW Women and Gender Studies Program at Tel Aviv University is the first bachelor's degree-granting program of its kind in the Middle East, providing an interdisciplinary analysis of issues impacting women and other minorities.  NCJW has expanded its Israel Granting Program to include Women to Women: NCJW's Empowerment Initiative. This new funding stream complements the work of Yad B' Yad by supporting women's empowerment projects that address women's rights and well-being in areas like economics, politics, education, domestic violence, and social justice.

Recent and current campaigns

NCJW's major initiatives include:

Higher Ground: NCJW's Domestic Violence Campaign A national effort to end domestic violence by improving the economic status of women. Grounded in the understanding that economic security is critical to women's safety, Higher Ground educates and mobilizes advocates, community-members, and decision-makers to promote progressive policy solutions that champion women's economic autonomy.

BenchMark: NCJW's Judicial Nominations Campaign Educates and mobilizes NCJW members, the Jewish community, and friends and allies everywhere to promote a federal bench with judges who support fundamental freedoms, including a woman's right to reproductive choice.

Plan A: NCJW's Campaign for Contraceptive Access Educates and empowers individuals to advocate for women's universal access to contraceptive information and health services. Through a combination of education and advocacy initiatives at the community, state, and national levels, Plan A aims to secure and protect access to contraceptive information and health services for all, putting individuals back in control of their personal health decisions.

NCJW's Promote the Vote, Protect the Vote Initiative is designed to secure and safeguard voting rights for all, and encourage participation in the democratic process at the community, state, and federal levels with the aim to ensure that every eligible voter is able to vote and to ensure that every vote cast is counted. NCJW also works with the non-partisan VoteRiders.

Bowdlerizing Scrabble While reading the Official Scrabble Players' Dictionary, Judith Grad found several words she considered to be offensive, including "jew", listed as a verb with the definition "To bargain with - an offensive term". Her initial letters to Merriam-Webster and Milton Bradley requesting removal of the words resulted in politely negative responses. Grad wrote to the National Council of Jewish Women, who began a letter-writing campaign in support of her cause. Publicity in Jewish media led to the Anti-Defamation League writing to Hasbro chairman Alan Hassenfeld, who announced that a third edition would be published with the "offensive" words removed. The news was generally not well received by members of the National Scrabble Association, which was not consulted in the decision. After receiving mostly negative feedback from players, including threats to boycott events, NSA president John D. Williams announced a compromise, the result of which was the publication of the unexpurgated Official Tournament and Club Word List.

Governance
NCJW is governed by a board of directors, president, and an executive committee. Headquartered in New York City, NCJW maintains offices in Washington, D.C., and Israel. Members vote on organizational policies and resolutions at national conventions, which have been held every two years before 1953 and every three years since then.

Council presidents
Council presidents at the national level:

1893–1905 Hannah G. Solomon
1905–1908 Pauline Hanauer Rosenberg
1908–1913 Marion Simon Misch
1913–1920 Janet Simons Harris
1920–1926 Rose Brenner
1926 Constance Sporborg
1926–1932 Ida W. Friend
1932–1938 Fanny Brin
1938–1943 Blanche Goldman 
1943–1949 Mildred G. Welt
1949–1955 Katharine Engel
1955–1959 Gladys F. Cahn
1959–1963 Viola Hymes 
1963–1967 Pearl Willen
1967–1971 Josephine Weiner 
1971–1975 Eleanor Marvin 
1875–1979 Esther R. Landa
1979–1983 Shirley I. Leviton 
1983–1987 Barbara A. Mandel
1987–1990 Lenore Feldman 
1990–1993 Joan Bronk
1993–1996 Susan Katz
1996–1999 Nan Rich
1999–2002 Jan Schneiderman
2002–2005 Marsha Atkind
2005–2008 Phyllis Snyder
2008–2011 Nancy Ratzan
2011–2014 Linda Slucker
2014–2017 Debbie Hoffmann
2017–2020 Beatrice Kahn
2020- Dana Gershon

Notable people
Other notable people:
 Mary M. Cohen
 Nina Morais Cohen, one of the founders of the National Council of Jewish Women
 Julia I. Felsenthal, one of the founders of the National Council of Jewish Women
 Cecilia Greenstone, "the Angel of Ellis Island"
 Luba Robin Goldsmith
 Rebekah Bettelheim Kohut, founder of the World Congress of Jewish Women, which later became the International Council of Jewish Women
 Minnie Dessau Louis, one of the founders of the National Council of Jewish Women
 Babette Mandel
 Maud Nathan
 Seraphine Eppstein Pisko
 Cecilia Razovsky
 Julia Richman
 Rosa Sonneschein, founder and editor of The American Jewess magazine
 Pauline Perlmutter Steinem, Jewish American suffragist, and  grandmother of feminist Gloria Steinem

See also

 Roe v. Wade
 Jewish feminism
 Child protection
 Social work
 Reform Judaism
 Jane Addams
 Hull House
 Jacksonian democracy
 Tel Aviv University

References

Bibliography 

 Cooper, Victoria. (2015) The Story of NCJW San Francisco Section: 115 Years of Courage, Compassion and Community Service
 Mayer, T. (1994) Women and the Israeli Occupation: The Politics of Change 
 Misra, K., Rich, M. (2003) Jewish Feminism in Israel: Some Contemporary Perspectives 
 Nadell, P. (2003) American Jewish Women's History 
 Rogow, F. (2005) Gone to Another Meeting: The National Council of Jewish Women (1893-1993) 
 De Lange, N., Freud-Kandel, M. (2005) Modern Judaism: An Oxford Guide

Archives and collections
 Guide to the National Council of Jewish Women Collection at the Leo Baeck Institute
National Council of Jewish Women, Indianapolis Section, Archives
 National Council of Jewish Women Records at the Library of Congress
 A Guide to the National Council of Jewish Women, San Antonio Section, University of Texas at San Antonio Libraries (UTSA Libraries) Special Collections
National Council of Jewish Women, New York Section at the American Jewish Historical Society in New York
National Council of Jewish Women, Greater Minneapolis section records at the Upper Midwest Jewish Archives, University of Minnesota Libraries
National Council of Jewish Women, St. Paul section records at the Upper Midwest Jewish Archives, University of Minnesota Libraries
 National Council of Jewish Women (Rochester Division) Records, Rare Books, Special Collections, and Preservation, River Campus Libraries, University of Rochester

External links
 Official website
 NCJW Action Center

 
Feminism in the United States
Jewish-American political organizations
Women's political advocacy groups in the United States
Organizations established in 1893
Jewish feminism
Migration-related organizations based in the United States
Non-profit organizations based in Washington, D.C.
501(c)(3) organizations